Hollow Tree Nights and Days is a children's book written by Albert Bigelow Paine and illustrated by J. M. Condé. It was published by Harper & Brothers in 1915. The book continues the tales of the 'Coon, the 'Possum, the Old Black Crow, and their friends.

The general setting of this book is 'the story teller' who sits in a rocking chair in front of the old fireplace, with the 'Little Lady' sitting on his lap as he smokes a pipe and tells the old stories of the Hollow Tree Folk.

The book contain pen-and-ink illustrations of the stories, including a new map of the Hollow Tree and Deep Woods Country.

The Hollow Tree Series
The Hollow Tree and Deep Woods Book (1901)
The Hollow Tree Snowed-In Book (1910)
Hollow Tree Nights and Days (1915)

External links
 
 Full text of Hollow Tree Nights and Days, Harper & Brothers.

1915 short story collections
Children's short story collections
American short story collections
American children's books
Harper & Brothers books
Animal tales
1915 children's books